Linda Jane Fisher was a Vice President Safety, Health and Environment and Chief Sustainability Officer of DuPont.

When working for the United States Environmental Protection Agency she was Deputy Administrator in the George W. Bush administration; Assistant Administrator - Office of Prevention, Pesticides and Toxic Substances in the George H. W. Bush administration; and Assistant Administrator - Office of Policy, Planning and Evaluation, and Chief of Staff to the EPA Administrator in the Ronald Reagan administration.  She was also Vice President of Government Affairs for Monsanto Company, a pesticide and biotechnology corporation. Fisher was also "Of Counsel" with the law firm Latham & Watkins. She attended Miami University for a B.A. (1974), George Washington University for a masters in Business Administration (1978) and the Ohio State University for a law degree (1982).

In an oral history, EPA Administrator William K. Reilly described Fisher as one of his ablest people, proving to be a star as his Assistant Administrator for Toxics and Pesticides.

Publicity

Fisher was mentioned in the documentary Circle of Poison (2018) reporting the export of chemical products manufactured in the US for export that are banned from domestic use.

Fisher was mentioned in the documentary The Future of Food (2004) as an example of a revolving door between Monsanto and the government.

Further reading
· EPA Alumni Association: A Half Century of Progress – former senior EPA officials describe the evolution of the U.S. fight to protect the environment

· EPA Alumni Association: Toxic Substances, A Half Century of Progress, March 1, 2016

References

External links

1952 births
Living people
People from Saginaw, Michigan
Miami University alumni
George Washington University School of Business alumni
Ohio State University Moritz College of Law alumni
Ohio lawyers
American businesspeople
American women in business
People of the United States Environmental Protection Agency
Reagan administration personnel
George H. W. Bush administration personnel
Monsanto employees
George W. Bush administration personnel
DuPont people
21st-century American women